Khairul Anuar bin Mohamad (born 22 September 1991) is a Malaysian professional archer. He began to compete for the national team in 2011.

2011 FITA Archery World Cup
Khairul participated in the 2011 FITA Archery World Cup Stage 4 in Shanghai, China in what was only his third international tournament. He became the first Malaysian to ever win a medal at an individual World Cup event when he was defeated in the finals of the men's individual recurve event by American Joe Fanchin.

2011 Asian Archery Championships
He was part of the Malaysian contingent at the 2011 Asian Archery Championships in Tehran, Iran which came away two gold medals and two silver medals. Khairul contributed towards both gold medals. He defeated Hideki Kikuchi of Japan 6-2 in the final of the men's individual event and was part of the Malaysian team which defeated China 187-184 in the final of the men's team event.

2012 Summer Olympics
At the 2012 Summer Olympics he competed for his country in the Men's individual event and the Men's team event.
Khairul made it to the quarter-final stage of the individual event, where he was stopped by eventual silver-medallist Takaharu Furukawa of Japan, while the Malaysian team lost in the first round.

2016 Summer Olympics
Khairul earned his spot in men’s individual event after winning the Continental Quota Tournament (CQT) in Bangkok. He lost to Germany's Florian Floto, Khairul won the first two sets 27-26 and 27-23 before Floto took the next three sets 29-27, 28-25 and 30-29 (4-6). He also took part in team events where they lost to France (2-6).

2019 World Championships 
At the 2019 World Championships, Khairul reached the final, where he lost to World number one Brady Ellison.  The final required a tie-break after the fifth set for the winner to be decided, with the first three sets having been tied, and then the archers winning one set each.  It was the first archery World Championship medal won by a Malaysian archer.  This silver medal also secured a place for a Malaysian archer at the 2020 Summer Olympics.  Following his performance at the World Championships, Khairul was shortlisted for World Archery's Male Athlete of the year for recurve archers.

2020 Summer Olympics
At the 2020 Summer Olympics, he participated in the men's individual event and the mixed team event with Syaqiera Mashayikh.

References

External links
 
 

Malaysian male archers
1991 births
Living people
People from Terengganu
Malaysian Muslims
Malaysian people of Malay descent
Olympic archers of Malaysia
Archers at the 2012 Summer Olympics
Archers at the 2016 Summer Olympics
Asian Games medalists in archery
Asian Games silver medalists for Malaysia
Archers at the 2014 Asian Games
Medalists at the 2014 Asian Games
Southeast Asian Games gold medalists for Malaysia
Southeast Asian Games silver medalists for Malaysia
Southeast Asian Games bronze medalists for Malaysia
Southeast Asian Games medalists in archery
Archers at the 2018 Asian Games
Competitors at the 2013 Southeast Asian Games
Competitors at the 2015 Southeast Asian Games
Competitors at the 2017 Southeast Asian Games
Competitors at the 2019 Southeast Asian Games
World Archery Championships medalists
Archers at the 2020 Summer Olympics
Competitors at the 2021 Southeast Asian Games
21st-century Malaysian people